Bacuna is a Dutch surname. Notable people with this surname include:
Johnsen Bacuna (born 1985), Curaçaoan footballer
Juninho Bacuna (born 1997), Curaçaoan footballer
Leandro Bacuna (born 1991), Curaçaoan footballer

Dutch-language surnames